Tony La Russa Baseball 4 is a 1997 video game developed by Stormfront Studios and published by Maxis. The game is named after Hall of Famer baseball person Tony La Russa.

Reception

GameSpot gave the game a score of 5.4 out of 10 stating "Even with its few strong points (simulation, management), this product is far from a winner. There are already five traditional computer baseball games on the market this year, and Tony La Russa Baseball 4 is the worst of the lot"

References

1997 video games
Stormfront Studios games
Baseball video games
Windows games
Windows-only games
Maxis games